South Riding is a census-designated place and planned community in Loudoun County, Virginia, United States. The South Riding homeowner association was founded in January 1995 to provide services to the community. Neighboring U.S. Route 50 and State Route 28 provide access to the Dulles/Reston/Tysons Corner technology corridor and other major employment centers in Northern Virginia and Washington, D.C.

In 2010, the population was 24,256. In 2019, the United States Census Bureau estimated it to be 31,515.

History

Guiding principles 
According to South Riding Proprietary, its mission is "...[T]o promote the health, safety, welfare and interests of all residents, preserving property values, enhancing the aesthetic beauty and fostering a spirit of community for all members." The South Riding vision is to create the best community to live and raise a family in Northern Virginia.

Establishment and development 
In January 1995, the Declarant of developers who owned the land established South Riding Proprietary as a not for profit corporation, as a way of providing services to residents of what became South Riding. In 2009, South Riding Proprietary was granted 501(c)(4) status by the Internal Revenue Service. The Proprietary continues to own and govern South Riding.

Recreational and cultural activities 
Parks, recreation, and community activities are managed by the Dulles South Recreation & Community Center, located along Riding Center Drive. The center is home to, among other activities, a climbing wall, a competitive pool, a leisure pool, a senior center, and facilities which can be rented.

Parks and recreation 
South Riding features numerous green spaces, with around 6 miles of trails.

South Riding is home to South Riding Golf Club, designed by golf course architect Dan Maples, and opened in 1997. It was voted one of the "Top 100 Courses in the Mid-Atlantic" by the Washington Golf Monthly Magazine, and was voted "Best New Course" by Golf Digest in 1998. South Riding is also near the Pleasant Valley Golf Club, the Chantilly National Golf and Country Club, Monster Mini Golf, and the International Country Club, all in Chantilly.

South Riding is home to several lakes, as well as Elklick Run.

South Riding has several pools, including South Riding Center Pool, South Riding Meadows Pool, Town Hall Pool, and the Hyland Hills Swimming Pool and Splash Park, as well as the indoor pools at the Dulles South Recreation & Community Center.

Transportation 
South Riding is less than a mile south of U.S. Route 50, which connects the town to Chantilly and Virginia State Route 28 in the east. South Riding is crossed by four other major roads: Virginia State Route 2200 (Tall Cedars Parkway) in the center, Virginia State Route 742 (Poland Road) in the center, Virginia State Route 606 (Loudoun County Parkway) slightly to the west, Virginia State Route 659 (Gum Spring Road), which forms the town's western border, Virginia State Route 609, Virginia State Route 620, which forms the town's southern border, and Virginia State Route 28. The Fairfax County line forms the town's eastern border.

South Riding is served by the East Gate bus station in the Town Center, which serves and is the eastern terminus of the 88 route. The 88 route connects the town to settlements further west along U.S. Route 50, including Stone Ridge.

Geography 
South Riding is located in southeastern Loudoun County. Neighboring communities are Arcola and Dulles to the north, Stone Ridge to the west, Conklin to the south, Schneider Crossroads to the southeast, and Chantilly in Fairfax County to the east.

The community is drained by Elklick Run, a south-flowing tributary of Cub Run and part of the Bull Run watershed flowing south to the Occoquan River and eventually the tidal Potomac River.

Climate 
The climate in this area is characterized by hot, humid summers and generally mild to cool winters. According to the Köppen Climate Classification system, South Riding has a humid subtropical climate, abbreviated "Cfa" on climate maps.

Government 
South Riding is a census-designated place in Loudoun County; therefore, schools, roads, and law enforcement are provided by the county.

South Riding Proprietary staff 
South Riding is owned and governed by the not for profit South Riding Proprietary. All persons who purchase residential property in South Riding are automatically members of the Proprietary, and are subject to dues, which cannot be severed unless the property is sold. By the governing documents, members are subject to responsibilities, and are granted rights and privileges. The Proprietary is headquartered at Town Hall on Center Street, and is led by general manager Wendy Taylor.

Board of directors 
The board of directors is the executive branch of the community government, led by the president, currently Karen MacDowell, and the vice president, currently Michael Hardin. Of the nine members, six are elected by residents, and three are appointed by the Declarant. As stated by the governing documents, the Board's responsibilities include, "developing the annual budget 

and setting assessments, promulgating and enforcing rules and regulations, administering the architectural scheme of the community and regulating exterior appearance of the homes and providing for the necessary personnel and contractual services to maintain all commonly owned property and facilities". The board of directors also establishes committees which handle specific issues. The board meets monthly at the South Riding Center.

Representation 
South Riding lies entirely within Virginia's 10th congressional district, currently represented in Congress by Representative Jennifer Wexton (D-Leesburg). It is represented by Karrie Delaney (D-Centreville) in the state House of Delegates, and by John J. Bell in the state Senate.

Local media 
South Riding lies within the distribution zone for two national newspapers, the Washington Post, and the Washington Times, as well as for the local Loudoun Times-Mirror. South Riding is also covered by AOL's Patch service's Chantilly division.

Education

Primary and secondary schools 
As a part of Loudoun County, South Riding is served by Loudoun County Public Schools and private schools. South Riding has one high school, Freedom High School, serving the entire town. Middle schoolers in South Riding attend either J. Michael Lunsford Middle School or Mercer Middle School.

Public elementary schools 

 Hutchison Farm Elementary School
 Cardinal Ridge Elementary 
 Little River Elementary School
 Pinebrook Elementary
 Liberty Elementary School

Private schools 

 Bach to Rock South Riding
 Montessori School of South Riding
 Everbrook Academy of South Riding
 Minnieland Academy at South Riding
 Kiddie Academy of South Riding
 The Madame Curie School of Science & Technology
 ALOHA Mind Math of South Riding
 East Gate Montessori School
 The Goddard School of Chantilly
 Winwood Children's Center
 C2 Education of South Riding
 South Riding KinderCare
 Primrose School of South Riding
 Huntington Learning Center of South Riding
 South Riding Learning Center
 St. Paul VI Catholic High School

Colleges and universities 
South Riding is near multiple higher education centers, including Virginia Christian University, The Long & Foster Institute - Chantilly, Strayer University, and the Mayo College North American Chapter.

Public libraries 
South Riding is served by Gum Spring Library, a branch of Loudoun County Public Library in Stone Ridge.

Demographics 
As of 2020, South Riding has a median household income of $168,738. The average listing price for homes in South Riding is between $511,000 and $624,000. Loudoun County also ranks as the 10th most educated county in the nation.

As of the 2010 census:
White	 74.1%,	 
Black	 5.08%,	 
Asian	 13.53%,	 
Hispanic 11.18%.	 
Between 2009 and 2014, the White population is expected to grow by 25%, the African American population by 37%, the Asian population by 90% and Hispanic population by 81%. The age breakdown of the town is 8.0% under 5 years old, 32.6% under 18 years old, and 65 years or older around 5.8%.

References

External links 

South Riding Proprietary, homeowners' association
Information on South Riding businesses and activities
Dulles South
Schools serving South Riding
Little River Elementary School
Hutchison Farm Elementary School
Liberty Elementary School
Pinebrook Elementary School
Mercer Middle School
Lunsford Middle School
Freedom High School
Champe High School
Saint Paul VI Catholic High School

Census-designated places in Loudoun County, Virginia
Census-designated places in Virginia
Washington metropolitan area